'Gwer West' is a Local Government Area of Benue State, Nigeria. Its headquarters are in the town of Naka.
 
It has an area of 1,094 km2 and a population of 122,145 at the 2006 census.

The postal code of the area is 971.

it has fifteen council wards and kindreds; Sengev, Tsambe/Mbesev, Merkyen, Nyamshi, Gaambe-Ushin, Mbachohon, Mbapa, Tijime, Avihijime, Gbange/Tongov, Toughatee/Injaha, Sengev/Yengev, Saghev/Ukusu, Ikyagev, Mbabuande. Chief Daniel Ayua Abomtse is the current paramount ruler. the current Chairman is Hon (Mrs) Grace Igbabon. There are some other important settlements in the local government apart from the headquarters, these include Orawe, Bunaka, Agagbe, Nagi, Aondoana, Kula, Jimba, Anguhar, Atukpu and Ajigba. Ikyande is another popular market in Gwer West Local Government Area.

References

Local Government Areas in Benue State